Ecko Records is an American blues and soul blues record label, founded in 1995 by John Ward in Memphis, Tennessee.

Ecko Records has released albums by Rufus Thomas, Barbara Carr, Denise LaSalle, Lee "Shot" Williams, Bill Coday, Earl Gaines, O.B. Buchana, Ollie Nightingale, Carl Sims, Quinn Golden, and numerous others.  Ecko Records continues to operate in Memphis.

'Ecko Records' is also a separate record label operating in the United Kingdom. Set up and founded by two DJs (Davey Boy and Nicky G) it is based on bassline house (dance) and have tracks signed up to Ministry of Sound and All Around the World.

References

External links

American record labels
English record labels
American companies established in 1995